Pasembur (locally Pasemboq or Pasembot) is a Malaysian salad consisting of cucumber (shredded), potatoes, beancurd, turnip, bean sprouts, prawn fritters, spicy fried crab, fried squid or other seafoods and served with a sweet and spicy nut sauce.

The term Pasembur is peculiar to northern Peninsular Malaysia. It is especially associated with Penang where Pasembur can be had along Gurney Drive. In other parts of Malaysia, the term Rojak Mamak is commonly used.  

In the northern peninsula especially in Penang, Rojak specifically refers to the fruit salad called Rojak Buah by the rest of Malaysia.

See also
List of salads
 Mamak stall
 Mamak Rojak

References

Malaysian cuisine
Salads